Pingasa aigneri is a moth of the family Geometridae first described by Louis Beethoven Prout in 1930. It is found in Japan.

The wingspan is 37–38 mm. The wings are white and strongly irrorated (sprinkled) and clouded with a light olivaceous drab grey.

Subspecies
Pingasa aigneri aigneri
Pingasa aigneri pallida Yazaki, 1995

References

Pseudoterpnini
Moths of Japan
Moths described in 1930
Taxa named by Louis Beethoven Prout